
Alfons König (29 December 1898 – 8 July 1944) was a German officer in the Wehrmacht of Nazi Germany during World War II and a recipient of the Knight's Cross of the Iron Cross with Oak Leaves and Swords. He was killed in action near Bobruisk on 8 July 1944 during the Soviet summer offensive, Operation Bagration.

Awards

 Iron Cross (1939) 2nd Class (12 June 1940) & 1st Class (22 June 1940)
 Knight's Cross of the Iron Cross with Oak Leaves and Swords
 Knight's Cross on 21 December 1940 as Oberleutnant and chief of the 6./Infanterie-Regiment 199 "List".
 194th Oak Leaves on 21 February 1943 as Hauptmann and commander of the III./Grenadier-Regiment 217
 70th Swords on 9 June 1944 as Oberstleutnant of the Reserves and commander of Grenadier-Regiment 199 "List"

References

Citations

Bibliography

 
 

1898 births
1944 deaths
German Army personnel of World War I
Recipients of the clasp to the Iron Cross, 1st class
German Army personnel killed in World War II
Military personnel from Munich
Recipients of the Knight's Cross of the Iron Cross with Oak Leaves and Swords
People from the Kingdom of Bavaria
Reichswehr personnel
German Army generals of World War II